Turno di notte is an Italian television series produced by Dario Argento. It had one season of 15 episodes running from 1987 to 1988.

Production
Dario Argento worked in television as a producer of the series which consisted of 15 episodes. The series revolves around stories that happen to cab drivers during a night shift. Episodes were directed by Luigi Cozzi and Lamberto Bava.

The series was broadcast on Rai Due between late 1987 and early 1988.

See also
List of Italian television series

References

Footnotes

Sources

External links
 

Italian television series
Dario Argento
1987 Italian television series debuts
1988 Italian television series endings
RAI original programming